.koeln is a geographic top-level domain for Cologne, Germany in the Domain Name System of the Internet. It was officially launched in 2014.

See also
.de

References

External links

IANA  whois information
 whois
Original application

koeln
Internet in Germany
koeln